Lanistes ovum is a species of freshwater snail with an operculum, an African apple snail, an aquatic gastropod mollusk in the family Ampullariidae.

The shell coiling in this species is left-handed, aka sinistral.

This species of snail is widely found in Botswana, Congo, Chad, Ghana, Cameroon, Gambia, Angola, Namibia, Niger, Nigeria, Tanzania, Mozambique, Zimbabwe and South Africa.

Habitat
These snails are found at an altitude of between 0 and 920 m (3,018 feet).

References

Ampullariidae
Freshwater snails
Gastropods described in 1845
Taxa named by Wilhelm Peters
Gastropods of Africa
Invertebrates of Angola
Invertebrates of Botswana
Invertebrates of Chad
Invertebrates of the Democratic Republic of the Congo
Invertebrates of Cameroon
Invertebrates of Namibia
Invertebrates of West Africa
Invertebrates of Tanzania
Invertebrates of Mozambique
Invertebrates of Zimbabwe